R D Memorial High School (RDMHS) is a dual-campus private primary and high school located in Mumbai, India.  Founded in 2003 by the Narsingh Education Society, RDMHS offers kindergarten to high school education. The school has campuses located in Vakipada, Naigaon, in the Palghar district and in Kashigaon, Kashimira, in the Thane district.

The Maharashtra State Board of Secondary and Higher Secondary Education provides educational oversight of the school.

See also 
 List of schools in Mumbai

References 

Private schools in Mumbai
High schools and secondary schools in Mumbai